The James B. Colt House is a historic house at 154 Wethersfield Avenue in Hartford, Connecticut.  Built in 1855, it is a high-quality example of Italianate architecture.  It was built for James B. Colt, the brother of industrialist Samuel Colt, whose Armsmear estate is just to the north.  The house was listed on the National Register of Historic Places in 1975.

Description and history
The James B. Colt House is located in the Sheridan-Charter Oak neighborhood of southern Hartford, on the east side of Wethersfield Avenue near its junction with Alden Street.  It is situated facing Colt Park, a public city park that was originally part of the Colt family estate, and is south of the larger Armsmear estate of Samuel Colt.  It is a three-story masonry structure, built out of brick covered in stucco.  It has classic Italian villa features, including a low-pitch hip roof with deep bracketed eaves, and round-arch windows with decorative bracketed caps.  The street-facing west facade is restrained, with a single-story porch across its left half that wraps around to the north.  The western facade provides vistas of the park through tall windows on all three levels.

The house was built in 1855–57.  James B. Colt was then serving as treasurer for the Colt's Manufacturing Company, and lived in the house until 1859.  It afterward had a number of high-profile occupants, including General William B. Franklin, Colt's general manager until 1888, and George H. Day, one of Hartford's leading businessmen at the turn of the 20th century.  In the 20th century the building was subdivided into apartments, and suffered an inside fire in 1973.

See also
National Register of Historic Places listings in Hartford County, Connecticut

References

Houses on the National Register of Historic Places in Connecticut
National Register of Historic Places in Hartford, Connecticut
Houses completed in 1855
Houses in Hartford, Connecticut
Historic district contributing properties in Connecticut